Elections were held in the Niagara Region of Ontario on October 24, 2022, in conjunction with municipal elections across the province.

Niagara Regional Council

Fort Erie

Mayor
The results for mayor of Fort Erie were as follows:

Regional councillor
The results for regional councillor were as follows:

Grimsby
The results for mayor and regional councillor for Grimsby were as follows:

Mayor

Regional councillor

Lincoln
The results for mayor and regional councillor for Lincoln were as follows:

Mayor

Regional councillor

Niagara Falls

Mayor

Regional Council
Three to be elected at-large. Regional councillors do not sit in city council.

Niagara Falls City Council
Eight to be elected at-large.

Niagara-on-the-Lake
The results for lord mayor and regional councillor for Niagara-on-the-Lake were as follows:

Lord Mayor

Regional councillor

Pelham
The results for mayor and regional councillor for Pelham were as follows:

Mayor

Regional councillor

Port Colborne
The results for mayor and regional councillor for Port Colborne were as follows:

Mayor
Brothers Bill and Charles Steele ran against each other.

Regional councillor

St. Catharines

The 2022 St. Catharines municipal election took place on Monday October 24, 2022 to determine a mayor, regional and city councillors and school trustees in the city of St. Catharines, Ontario. Nominations opened on May 2 and close on August 19.

Mayor
Incumbent mayor Walter Sendzik announced on May 10, 2022 that he would not be running for re-election. Sendzik was elected in 2014 and re-elected in 2018. Running to replace him are regional councillors Mike Britton and Mat Siscoe. 

Source:

Regional Council
Six to be elected at-large. Regional councillors do not sit on city council.

Source:

St. Catharines City Council
Two to be elected in each ward. City councillors do not sit on regional council.

Ward 1 - Merriton

Ward 2 - St. Andrew's

Ward 3 - St. George's

Ward 4 - St. Patrick's

Ward 5 - Grantham

Ward 6 - Port Dalhousie

Thorold
The results for mayor and regional councillor for Thorold were as follows:

Mayor

Regional councillor

Wainfleet
Mayor Kevin Gibson ran for a second term. The results for mayor of Wainfleet were as follows:

Welland
The results for mayor, regional councillor and city council for Welland are as follows:

Mayor
Incumbent mayor Frank Campion was challenged by Jeff Walters, who had previously run for the Alberta Party in the 2019 Alberta general election.

Regional Council
Two to be elected at-large. Regional councillors do not sit in city council.

Welland City Council

Two to be elected in each ward. City councillors do not sit on regional council.

Ward 1

Ward 2

Ward 3

Ward 4

Ward 5

Ward 6

West Lincoln
The results for mayor and regional councillor for West Lincoln were as follows:

Mayor

Regional councillor

References

External links

Municipal elections in St. Catharines
2022 Ontario municipal elections
Politics of the Regional Municipality of Niagara